Laura Szabó (born 19 November 1997) is a Hungarian handballer for MTK Budapest and the Hungarian national team.

She made her international debut on 22 March 2018 against the Netherlands.

Achievements 
Magyar Kupa:
Finalist: 2016, 2018

References

External links

1997 births
Living people
Handball players from Budapest
Hungarian female handball players
20th-century Hungarian women
21st-century Hungarian women